Thomas Morgan (20 May 1702 – 12 April 1769) was a Welsh lawyer and  politician who sat in the House of Commons from 1723 to 1769.

Morgan was the younger son of Sir John Morgan and his wife Martha Vaughan, daughter of Gwyn Vaughan of Trebarried, Breconshire. He received the estate of Rhiwpera upon his father's death in 1720.

Morgan was returned as Member of Parliament for Brecon at a by-election on 24 May 1723. He was returned in a contest for Brecon at the  1727 British general election. In 1731, he succeeded his brother, Sir William Morgan, as Lord Lieutenant of Brecknockshire and Monmouthshire, and was appointed brigadier-general of the militia of those counties. At the 1734 British general election, he was returned  unopposed as MP for Monmouthshire, and was returned there again at the 1741 British general election. Also in 1741 was appointed Judge Advocate General, by which he became known as "General Morgan". He was returned for Breconshire at the 1747 British general election.

Morgan was returned unopposed for Breconshire again in  1754, 1761 and 1768. 

Upon the death of his nephew William Morgan in 1763, he inherited the Tredegar Estate. In 1768, he resigned the office of Judge Advocate General, and was succeeded by his deputy and son-in-law Charles Gould.

Around 1726, he had married Jane Colchester, the second daughter of Col. Maynard Colchester. His children by her included:
Thomas Morgan (of Rhiwpera) (1717–1771)
Jane Morgan (1731–1797), married Charles Gould, later Sir Charles Gould Morgan, 1st Baronet
Catherine Morgan (d. 1784), married Charles Van
Charles Morgan (1736–1787)
John Morgan (1742–1792)

Death
Thomas Morgan died on 12 April 1769.

References

1702 births
1769 deaths
Welsh lawyers
Members of the Parliament of Great Britain for Welsh constituencies
British MPs 1722–1727
British MPs 1727–1734
British MPs 1734–1741
British MPs 1741–1747
British MPs 1747–1754
British MPs 1754–1761
British MPs 1761–1768
British MPs 1768–1774
Lord-Lieutenants of Brecknockshire
Lord-Lieutenants of Monmouthshire